Natalie Don (born 1989) is a Scottish National Party (SNP) politician who has served as the Member of the Scottish Parliament (MSP) for Renfrewshire North and West since 2021.

Early life
Don is from Renfrewshire and was raised in a council house by a single mother, following the death of her father when she was young.

She holds a university degree in history from the University of Glasgow.

Political career
Don continued to serve as a local councillor for the Bishopton, Bridge of Weir and Langbank ward after having been elected in the 2017 Renfrewshire Council election. She stood down after the 2022 local council elections in Scotland.

She was selected as the SNP's candidate for the Renfrewshire North and West constituency in November 2020 for the 2021 Scottish Parliament election, following a tight second vote by party members after the first vote had resulted in a tie with fellow Renfrewshire councillor Michelle Campbell. Don was subsequently elected as MSP for the constituency with a 46.3% vote share and majority of 7,307 (19.1%) votes.

Personal life
Don lives in the Renfrewshire village of Bridge of Weir and gave birth to a daughter in 2020. She is an avid fan of video games.

References

External links
 
 Twitter

Date of birth missing (living people)
1989 births
Living people
Scottish National Party MSPs
Members of the Scottish Parliament 2021–2026
Female members of the Scottish Parliament
Scottish National Party councillors
Councillors in Renfrewshire
People associated with Renfrewshire
Women councillors in Scotland